Jesús Eduardo González Mendivil (born 1 January 1998) is a Mexican footballer who plays as a defender for Cimarrones de Sonora Premier.

References

External links
 

1998 births
Living people
Atlético Morelia players
Monarcas Morelia Premier players
Potros UAEM footballers
Liga MX players
Liga Premier de México players
Tercera División de México players
Association football defenders
Footballers from Sonora
Mexican footballers